Cat Bi International Airport  ( a.k.a. ) is an international airport located in Hai Phong, Vietnam.

History

First Indochina War
During the war Cat Bi Air Base was used by French Air Force, units based there included:
Group de Chasse 2/22 Languedoc equipped with the F8F Bearcat
Bomber Squadron 1/19 Gascogne equipped with the B-26 Invader
Bomber Squadron 1/25 Tunisie equipped with the B-26

The base was also used by French Naval Aviation, units based there included:
Flotille 28F equipped with the PB4Y-2 Privateer
the air groups of the Arromanches and Bois Belleau

On 14 November 1953 the United States Air Force 483d Troop Carrier Wing flew five C–119s from Clark Air Base to Cat Bi to qualify French Air Force crews on them. In December 1953 in order to support C–119s, the USAF deployed to Cat Bi detachments of the 483d Troop Carrier Wing, the 8081st Aerial Resupply Unit and a provisional maintenance squadron of the Far East Air Logistics Force in what was known as Operation Cat Paw which had a peak strength in April 1954 of 121 men.

On the night of 6/7 March 1954 the Viet Minh attacked the base destroying 1 B-26 and 6 Morane-Saulnier MS.500 Criquets.

On 9 March 1954 civilian pilots from the CIA-backed Civil Air Transport (CAT) arrived at Cat Bi to begin flying C-119s, they began flying cargo missions on 12 March. Cat Bi-based CAT aircraft flew a total of 682 missions in support of the Battle of Dien Bien Phu between 13 March and 6 May 1954.

On 22 May 1954 the 483d Troop Carrier Wing maintenance detachment at Cat Bi relocated to Tourane Air Base.

Vietnam War
During the war the base was used by the Vietnam People's Air Force. On 9 January and 10 February 1968 United States jets attacked the base.

On 26 August 1972 during Operation Linebacker U.S. Navy jets bombed the base.

In early 1973 U.S. C-130 aircraft flew into Cat Bi to deliver minesweeping equipment as part of Operation End Sweep.

Expansion
Vietnam has announced a new master plan to upgrade the airport with a 3,050-meter second runway, a new terminal, and a new apron by 2015.  The existing runway will also be upgraded.  After the expansion, the airport will be capable of serving up to 4–5 million passengers a year.
The first phase of the project was completed in May 2016, enabling this airport a capacity of 2 million passengers per year.

The new terminal and new runway were opened on 12 May 2016. The airport can serve the Boeing 767, Airbus A350 XWB and similar aircraft.

Airlines and destinations

See also

 List of airports in Vietnam

Notes
 Cat Bi International Airport became international airport from 00:01 of 11 May 2016.
 Ready for new international flight to Guangzhou, China at the end of Apr

References

External links
French military images of Cat Bi supporting the Battle of Dien Bien Phu

Airports in Vietnam
Buildings and structures in Haiphong